Airat Bakare (born 20 May 1967) is a retired Nigerian female sprinter who specialized in the 400 metres event.

Bakare finished fifth in 4 x 400 metres relay at the 1991 World Championships, together with teammates Fatima Yusuf, Mary Onyali-Omagbemi and Charity Opara.

On the individual level, Bakare won a bronze medal at the 1991 All-Africa Games, a gold medal at the 1988 African Championships and a bronze medal at the 1989 African Championships.

She now resides in New York City with her two daughters and husband.

External links
 
 
 

1967 births
Living people
Yoruba sportswomen
Nigerian female sprinters
Athletes (track and field) at the 1988 Summer Olympics
Olympic athletes of Nigeria
World Athletics Championships athletes for Nigeria
African Games bronze medalists for Nigeria
African Games medalists in athletics (track and field)
Athletes (track and field) at the 1991 All-Africa Games
Olympic female sprinters
Universiade medalists in athletics (track and field)
Universiade bronze medalists for Nigeria
20th-century Nigerian women